The Government of Arunachal Pradesh also known as the State Government of Arunachal Pradesh, or locally as State Government, is the  subnational government of the Indian state of Arunachal Pradesh and its 25 districts. It consists of an executive, led by the Governor of Arunachal Pradesh, a judiciary and a legislative branch.

Like other states in India, the head of state of Arunachal Pradesh is the Governor, appointed by the President of India on the advice of the Central government. The office of the governor post is largely ceremonial. The Chief Minister is the head of government and is vested with most of the executive powers. Itanagar is the capital of Arunachal Pradesh, and houses the Arunachal Pradesh Legislative Assembly and the secretariat. The Gauhati High Court, Itanagar Permanent bench at Naharlagun exercises the jurisdiction and powers  in respect of cases arising in the State of Arunachal Pradesh.

The present Legislative Assembly of Arunachal Pradesh is unicameral, consisting of 60 Members of the Legislative Assembly (M.L.A). Its term is 5 years, unless sooner dissolved.

See also 
 Arunachal Pradesh Legislative Assembly
Tesam Pongte is the current Deputy Speaker of Arunachal Pradesh.

References

External links